Beaver Crossing is a hamlet in central Alberta, Canada within the Municipal District of Bonnyville No. 87, located on Highway 28 where it crosses the Beaver River, approximately  south of Cold Lake. Near here was Cold Lake House built by the Montreal traders in 1781.

Demographics 
Beaver Crossing recorded a population of 18 in the 1991 Census of Population conducted by Statistics Canada.

See also 
List of communities in Alberta
List of hamlets in Alberta

References 

Municipal District of Bonnyville No. 87
Hamlets in Alberta